Gelechia asinella is a moth of the family Gelechiidae. It is found in France, Germany, Austria, Switzerland, Italy, the Czech Republic, Slovakia, Slovenia, Serbia, Hungary, Romania and Poland, as well as on Corsica.

The wingspan is 16–17 mm.

The larvae have been observed feeding on Salix species.

References

Moths described in 1796
Gelechia